Effie Yeaw Nature Center is a nature center inside Ancil Hoffman Park in the city of Carmichael, California.

References

Carmichael, California
Nature centers in California
Nature reserves in California
Parks in Sacramento County, California